Curt Johnson is an American soccer executive who currently serves as General Manager and President of North Carolina Football Club, home of North Carolina FC of the USL Championship and the North Carolina Courage of the National Women’s Soccer League.

A Raleigh native, Johnson graduated from Ravenscroft School and played collegiately at North Carolina State University, where he served as senior captain, helped the Wolfpack win the 1990 ACC Championship and graduated with a degree in communications studies. In 2013, Johnson was inducted into the North Carolina Soccer Hall of Fame.

Before working in his current position, Johnson previously worked for the Richmond Kickers, Kansas City Wizards, Carolina Hurricanes and U.S. Club Soccer.

Playing career 

Following his prep career at Ravenscroft School and Capital Area Soccer League (CASL), Johnson continued his player career at the collegiate level in his hometown, starring for the NC State Wolfpack men’s soccer team from 1987-90.

During his career with the Wolfpack, Johnson appeared in 72 matches, and served as a captain in his senior season, as NC State won an ACC Championship and reached the NCAA semifinals. After his playing career, Johnson would later return to NC State as an assistant coach.

North Carolina Football Club (North Carolina FC/NC Courage) 

In February 2011, it was announced that Johnson, who most recently worked for US Club Soccer, would serve as President of the Carolina RailHawks. In Johnson’s first season leading the club, the RailHawks won the NASL regular season title under first-year head coach Martin Rennie, going 17W-8L-3D with a then league-record 13-game unbeaten streak.

From 2012-14, the RailHawks achieved national notoriety and developed a reputation as one of the toughest second-division teams in the country to play against thanks to their performances in the Lamar Hunt U.S. Open Cup. From 2012-14, the RailHawks recorded five wins against Major League Soccer opponents, including three in as many years against the LA Galaxy. The RailHawks reached the quarterfinals of the competition in both 2012 and 2014.

In 2015, Johnson helped oversee the transfer in ownership of the RailHawks from Traffic Sports USA to Stephen Malik, a local Triangle businessman and medical software entrepreneur. Bolstered by new, local ownership, Johnson in 2016 was instrumental in the RailHawks hosting English Premier League Club West Ham United in front of a then North Carolina Football Club-record 10,125 fans.

In December 2016, the RailHawks rebranded to North Carolina FC, and in January 2017 Malik announced the addition of the North Carolina Courage, an NWSL team which Johnson was named president and general manager of.

Both NCFC and the Courage reached the postseason in 2017, as the Courage claimed the NWSL Shield and reached the league’s title game. Johnson also played a pivotal role in negotiating an historic partnership between North Carolina Football Club, Capital Area Soccer League and Triangle Futbol Club, which led to the creation of NCFC Youth, which Johnson currently serves on the board of. As a result, North Carolina Football Club is the largest youth-to-pro soccer organization in the U.S.

Ahead of the 2018 season, Johnson helped orchestrate a deals that saw the Courage acquire U.S. Women’s National Team star Crystal Dunn and former USWNT standout Heather O'Reilly, and the team became the first in NWSL history win both the shield and NWSL Championship.

Following the 2018 USL season, Johnson made his second NCFC coaching change, as the club announced the hiring of former U.S. Men’s National Team Manager Dave Sarachan on Dec. 17, 2018. With Sarachan in charge, NCFC finished seventh in the USL Championship Eastern Conference and reached the playoffs for the second time in three years in 2019. Meanwhile, the Courage made history by becoming the first team in NWSL history to win a league championship on its home field, as it defeated the Chicago Red Stars 4-0 in front 10,227 spectators, the largest crowd in North Carolina Football Club history.

Previous Front Office Experience 

Johnson’s first stint as a professional soccer executive came in the late 1990s with the Richmond Kickers of the A-League. From 1997-99, Johnson served in a leadership role, both as vice president of operations and general manager. During Johnson’s tenure with the Kickers, the team reached the postseason annually and won the Atlantic Division in 1998.

After his third season in Richmond, Johnson was chosen as the general manager of the Kansas City Wizards by Lamar Hunt and Clark Hunt. During his tenure with the Wizards, Johnson made an immediate impact, as Kansas City completed the double by winning both the MLS Supporters’ Shield and the MLS Cup in 2000. Four years later, Johnson and Kansas City once again lifted a trophy in 2004 with a win over the Chicago Fire in the U.S. Open Cup Final. In addition to his tactical and management decision making, Johnson was also instrumental in the transfer of ownership of the club from the Hunt family to OnGoal, LLC.

Before joining North Carolina Football Club in 2011, Johnson served as the Carolina Hurricanes’ director of marketing from 2007–08 and later worked for U.S. Club Soccer, where he was instrumental in developing strategies for growth of the game at the youth levels for both boys and girls.

References 

Sporting Kansas City
Major League Soccer executives
North American Soccer League executives
National Women's Soccer League executives
Living people
North Carolina FC
North Carolina Courage
Richmond Kickers
Carolina Hurricanes
1968 births